Yoneda Torao (March 10, 1839 – November 27, 1915) was an Imperial Japanese Army veteran of the Boshin War. He was born in Kumamoto Prefecture. He was Grand Chamberlain of Japan (1878-1884). He was recipient of the Order of the Rising Sun (2nd class, 1895; 1st class, 1915) and the Order of the Sacred Treasure (3rd class, 1888; 1st class, 1908).

References

Bibliography
 Office of Historiography, ed. "百官履歴 下巻" (Curricula Vitae of All Government Officials – Volume 1), Nihon Shiseki Kyokai, 1928.

 Inamura, Tetsugen and others, "大正過去帳 - 物故人名辞典" (Taisho Death Records – Biographical Dictionary of Deceased Individuals), Tokyo Bijutsu, 1973.

 Historical Society of Japan, ed. "明治維新人名辞典" (Biographical Dictionary of the Meiji Restoration), Yoshikawa Kobunkan, 1981.

 Asahi Shimbun, "朝日日本歴史人物事典" (Asahi Encyclopedia of Japanese Historical Figures), Asahi Shinbunsha 1994.

 Kasumi Kaikan Editorial Committee for a Complete Compilation of Genealogies of Peers, 平成新修旧華族家系大成 上巻 (Complete Compilation of the Genealogies of Former Peers: New Heisei Edition – Volume 1), Kasumi Kaikan, 1996.

 Hata, Ikuhiko, ed. "日本官僚制総合事典: 1868 – 2000" (Comprehensive Encyclopedia of the Japanese Bureaucracy: 1868 - 2000), Tokyo Daigaku Shuppankai, 2001.

 Yasuoka, Akio, ed. "幕末維新大人名事典 上巻" (Great Biographical Dictionary of the late-Edo and Meiji Periods – Volume 1), Shin Jinbutsu Oraisha, 2010.

1839 births
1915 deaths
Japanese military personnel
People of the Boshin War
People from Kumamoto Prefecture
Grand Cordons of the Order of the Rising Sun
Recipients of the Order of the Rising Sun, 2nd class
Recipients of the Order of the Sacred Treasure, 1st class
Recipients of the Order of the Sacred Treasure, 3rd class